Karl Gerald van den Boogaart is currently working as a Professor, TU Bergakademie Freiberg, Germany.  Boogart was a recipient of the Andrei Borisovich Vistelius Research Award in 2003, and in 2014 he was selected to receive Georges Matheron Lectureship Award from the International Association for Mathematical Geosciences.

Education
MS in Mathematics and Geography, in 1998, University of Augsburg
PhD in Spatial Statistics, in 2001 TU Bergakademie Freiberg

Selected Book

References

Living people
University of Augsburg alumni
Freiberg University of Mining and Technology alumni
Academic staff of the Freiberg University of Mining and Technology
Place of birth missing (living people)
21st-century German mathematicians
Year of birth missing (living people)
Georges Matheron Lectureship recipients
Spatial statisticians